Mamore!!!, styled as MAMORE!!! is the 17th single from Japanese idol group Idoling!!!. Mamore!!! reached number 2 on the Oricon weekly chart and number 3 on Music Station Power Ranking.

Contents 
Mamore!!! was released in four types:
 Limited A-type (CD and DVD)
 Limited B-type (CD and Blu-ray)
 Limited C-type (CD and photobook)
 Normal Type (CD only)

Track listing

CD

DVD 
 Mamore!!! Music video
 Mamore!!! Dancing version
 Mamore!!! Dancing version featuring Rurika & Ai
 Making of Mamore!!! MV

Blu-ray 
 Mamore!!! Music video
 Mamore!!! Music video, close up version
 Mamore!!! Dancing version
 Mamore!!! Dancing Version featuring Rurika & Ai
 Making of Mamore!!! MV
 Martin Solveig & Dragonette featuring Idoling!!!

Notes 
 Mamore!!! used as Fuji TV Kiseki Taiken! Unbelievable ending theme song for January - March 2012.
 Sara Sara Kyuuti Ko used as TBS Hanamaru Market ending theme song for January - March 2012. Participating members on this song are Erica Tonooka, Rurika Yokoyama, Hitomi Sakai, Kaede Hashimoto, Ruka Kurata, Kaoru Gotou, and Chika Ojima.
 Bakkyun! only available on first press limited edition. Participating members are Suzuka Morita, Hitomi Miyake, and Yurika Tachibana.

References

External links 
 Idoling!!! official site - Fuji TV
 Idoling!!! official site - Pony Canyon
 Kiseki Taiken! Unbelievable official site - Fuji TV
 Hanamaru Market official site - TBS

2012 singles
Idoling!!! songs
2012 songs
Pony Canyon singles